Centromochlus is a genus of fish in the family Auchenipteridae native to South America.

Species
There are currently 17 recognized species in this genus:
 Centromochlus altae Fowler, 1945
 Centromochlus bockmanni (Sarmento-Soares & Buckup, 2005)
 Centromochlus britskii Sarmento-Soares & Birindelli, 2015 
 Centromochlus concolor (Mees, 1974)
 Centromochlus existimatus Mees, 1974
 Centromochlus ferrarisi Birindelli, Sarmento-Soares & F. C. T. Lima, 2015 
 Centromochlus heckelii (De Filippi, 1853)
 Centromochlus macracanthus Soares-Porto, 2000
 Centromochlus megalops Kner, 1858
 Centromochlus meridionalis Sarmento-Soares, Cabeceira, L. N. Carvalho, Zuanon & Akama, 2013 
 Centromochlus orca Sarmento-Soares, Lazzarotto, Rapp Py-Daniel & Leitão, 2016 
 Centromochlus perugiae Steindachner, 1882
 Centromochlus punctatus (Mees, 1974)
 Centromochlus reticulatus (Mees, 1974)
 Centromochlus romani (Mees, 1988)
 Centromochlus schultzi Rössel, 1962
 Centromochlus simplex (Mees, 1974)

References

Auchenipteridae
Catfish genera
Freshwater fish genera
Taxa named by Rudolf Kner